Kentavius Radkevian Street (born May 8, 1996) is an American football defensive tackle for the New Orleans Saints of the National Football League (NFL). He played college football at NC State.

College career
In the 2017 college football season, Street had 38 tackles and 3.5 sacks.

Professional career

San Francisco 49ers
Street tore his ACL at his pro day and was unlikely to play in 2018. Street was drafted by the San Francisco 49ers in the fourth round (128th overall) of the 2018 NFL Draft. He was placed on the reserve/non-football injury list on September 1, 2018 due to the knee injury.

On September 1, 2019, Street was placed on injured reserve. He was designated for return from injured reserve on December 4, 2019, and began practicing with the team again. He was activated on December 14, 2019. He was placed back on injured reserve on January 10, 2020. Without Street, the 49ers reached Super Bowl LIV, but lost 31-20 to the Kansas City Chiefs. He was placed on the active/physically unable to perform list at the start of training camp on July 28, 2020, and added back to the active roster seven days later.

New Orleans Saints
On March 18, 2022, Street signed with the New Orleans Saints.

References

External links
 NC State bio

1996 births
Living people
American football defensive ends
NC State Wolfpack football players
Sportspeople from Greenville, North Carolina
Players of American football from North Carolina
San Francisco 49ers players
New Orleans Saints players
African-American players of American football